Anthony "Anton" Rodgers (10 January 1933 – 1 December 2007) was an English actor and occasional director. He performed on stage, in film, in television dramas and sitcoms. He starred in several sitcoms, including Fresh Fields (ITV, 1984–86), its sequel French Fields (ITV, 1989–91), and May to December (BBC, 1989–94).

Early life and career
Rodgers was born in Ealing, the son of William Robert Rodgers and Leonore Victoria (née Wood). His early education was at Westminster City School. The family were evacuated to Wisbech, Isle of Ely during the war, where his father worked for Balding and Mansell, printers of ration books, permits and passes; Rodgers was sometimes erroneously reported as having been born in Wisbech. Later he was educated at the Italia Conti Academy and LAMDA. He appeared on stage from the age of 14. He was known for his television performances, specifically his long-running roles in the television sitcoms Fresh Fields in the 1980s and May to December from 1989 to 1994.

He also had a long career both on stage and in film. His stage roles ranged from contemporary comedy and satirical farce to Restoration comedy, Ibsen, Shaw and Wilde and Peter Nichols. He appeared in films such as The Man Who Haunted Himself (1970), Scrooge (1970, in which he performed the Academy Award-nominated Best Original Song "Thank You Very Much"), The Day of the Jackal (1973), and The Fourth Protocol (1987). He also narrated the children's animated TV series Old Bear Stories and appeared as Andre, the comically corrupt French policeman who aided Michael Caine in his romantic/financial schemes in Dirty Rotten Scoundrels.

He narrated programmes for the railway video production company Video 125, including Cornish Branchlines: A Drivers Eye View.

Personal life
Rodgers first married Morna Watson, a ballet dancer, in Kensington in 1959, and they had a son and a daughter and later divorced. Rodgers's second wife was the actress Elizabeth Garvie; they frequently appeared on stage together and toured giving readings from the works of Jane Austen and Robert Browning, among others. 

He was a patron of the Angles Theatre, Wisbech.

Rodgers died in Reading, Berkshire on 1 December 2007, aged 74.  At the time of his death, he was a resident of Whitchurch-on-Thames, Oxfordshire.

Credits

Theatre
Rodgers made his first West End appearance in 1947, aged 14, in Carmen at the Royal Opera House, Covent Garden. He followed this in same year with a tour of an adaptation of Charles Dickens' Great Expectations playing Pip, and the title role in a revival of Terence Rattigan's The Winslow Boy which toured the UK in 1948.  After repertory experience at Birmingham, Northampton and Hornchurch, he trained at LAMDA.

Returning to London in November 1957 he joined the cast of The Boy Friend at Wyndham's Theatre. Thereafter his credits include:

Fingers in The Crooked Mile, Cambridge Theatre, September 1959
Appeared in the revue And Another Thing, Fortune Theatre, October 1960
Appeared in the revue Twists, Arts Theatre, February 1962; and Edinburgh Festival, August 1962
Withers and Tim in John Osborne's double-bill, Plays for England, Royal Court, July 1962
He was a member of the original cast of the musical Pickwick, in which he played Mr Jingle, Saville Theatre July 1963; making his New York debut in the same role at the 46th Street Theatre, October 1965
Felix in The Owl and the Pussycat, Criterion Theatre, February 1966
Chichester Festival season 1967: Francis Archer in The Beaux' Stratagem; Randall Utterword in Heartbreak House; and Fadinard in the Labiche farce An Italian Straw Hat
Title role in Henry V, Belgrade Theatre, Coventry, March 1968
Vladimir in Waiting for Godot, University Theatre, Manchester, 1968
Directed A Piece of Cake and Grass Roots at Leatherhead, 1968
Devised and co-directed We Who Are About To... with George Melly at Hampstead Theatre, February 1969; eight one-act plays presented in a modified form as Mixed Doubles at the Comedy Theatre, April 1969
Dr Stockman in An Enemy of the People, Harrogate, August 1969
Directed The Fantasticks, Hampstead, May 1970, and took this production and The Rainmaker to the Ibiza Festival
Directed The Roses of Eyam and The Taming of the Shrew at the Northcott Theatre, Exeter, 1970
Gerald in The Formation Dancers, Hampstead Theatre, January 1971
Frank in Forget-Me-Not Lane (Peter Nichols), Greenwich Theatre, then Apollo Theatre, April 1971
Macheath in The Threepenny Opera, Stratford Festival, Ontario. 1972
Dr Rank in A Doll's House, Criterion Theatre, February 1973
Hildy Johnson in The Front Page. National Theatre production touring Australia, 1974
Lord Henry Wotton in The Picture of Dorian Gray, Greenwich Theatre, February 1975
Directed Death of a Salesman, Oxford Playhouse,  October 1975
Astrov in Uncle Vanya, Oxford Playhouse, December 1975
Jack Manningham in Gaslight, Criterion Theatre, March 1976
Directed Are You Now or Have You Ever Been...?, Bush Theatre, June 1977
Directed Flashpoint, New End Theatre, December 1978; May Fair Theatre, February 1979
Leading role in the 'musical entertainment' Songbook, Globe Theatre, July 1979
Songbook was at the Angles Theatre, Wisbech, Cambridgeshire for a single performance on a Sunday to raise funds for restoring this Georgian theatre.
Jim in Passion (Peter Nichols), RSC Aldwych Theatre, January 1981
Walter Burns in Windy City, Victoria Palace, July 1982
Richard de Beauchamp in Saint Joan (George Bernard Shaw), National Theatre Olivier, February 1984
Tudor Phillips in Some Singing Blood, Royal Court Theatre Upstairs, March 1992
Gerry Stratton in Time of My Life (Alan Ayckbourn), Vaudeville Theatre, August 1993
Dr Feldman in Duet for One revival (Tom Kempinski), Riverside Studios. May 1996
Etienne in Under the Doctor, Comedy Theatre. February 2001
Grandpa Potts in Chitty Chitty Bang Bang, London Palladium, April 2002

Selected filmography

 Vice Versa (1948) - Pupil (uncredited)
 The Browning Version (1951) - Pupil (uncredited)
 Operation Stogie (1959)
 Crash Drive (1959) - Tomson
 Night Train for Inverness (1960) - Scottish Doctor (uncredited)
 The Spider's Web (1960) - Sgt. Jones
 On the Fiddle (1960) - Soldier in NAAFI Canteen (uncredited)
 Tarnished Heroes (1961) - Don Conyers
 Part-Time Wife (1961) - Tom Briggs
 Petticoat Pirates (1961) - Alec
 Girl on Approval (1961) - Snooty Bowler-hatted Neighbour (uncredited)
 Carry On Cruising (1962) - Young Man
 The Traitors (1962) 
 The Iron Maiden (1962) - Concierge
 This Sporting Life (1963) - Restaurant Customer (uncredited)
 Carry On Jack (1964) - Hardy
 Comedy Workshop: Love and Maud Carver (1964) - P.R.O. / Window Dresser
 Rotten to the Core (1965) - The Duke
 To Chase a Million (1967) - Max Stein
 The Man Who Haunted Himself (1970) - Tony Alexander
 Scrooge (1970) - Tom Jenkins
 The Day of the Jackal (1973) - Jules Bernard
 Intimate Reflections (1975) - Michael White
 East of Elephant Rock (1977) - Mackintosh
 The Fourth Protocol (1987) - George Berenson
 Dirty Rotten Scoundrels (1988) - Inspector Andre
 Impromptu (1991) - Duke D'Antan
 Son of the Pink Panther (1993) - Chief Lazar
 Secret Passage (2004) - Foscari
 The Merchant of Venice (2004) - The Duke
 The Last Drop (2006) - Churchill (uncredited)
 Go Go Tales (2007) - Barfly

Television

 Brambly Hedge as Lord Woodmouse (voice)
 Maigret, as Radek in episode "Death in Mind" (1962)
 Old Bear Stories as Narrator, Old Bear, Bramwell Brown, Little Bear, Rabbit and many others (voices)
 The Old Curiosity Shop as Dick Swiveller
  The Sentimental Agent, as Mr Fripp in the episode 'The Height of Fashion' (1963). NB: Billed as 'Anton Rogers'.
 The Champions, as Jules in the episode 'Reply Box No 666' (1967).
 Danger Man as Attala
 Man in a Suitcase as Max Stein
 Gideon's Way as Peter in the episode, "The Nightlifers." (1966)
 The Prisoner episode "The Schizoid Man"  as Number Two.
 The Saint episode "A Double in Diamonds" (1967) as Pierre
 Randall and Hopkirk (Deceased) episode 16 "When the Spirit Moves You" as Calvin Bream
 The Elusive Pimpernel (1969) as Sir Percy Blakeney
 The Paz Show as Pappy (voice)
 Upstairs, Downstairs "The Mistress and the Maids" (1972)  as Scone
 The Protectors (1972 TV series) episode "King Con" as Alan Sutherland
 Thomas & Sarah (1979) episode "Love Into Three Won't Go" as Richard DeBrassey
 Play for Today episode "Coming Out" as Lewis Duncan / Zippy Grimes  Jason King  as Philippe de Brion
 The Duchess of Duke Street "A Test of Love" as Newdigate
 Something in Disguise (1982) as John Cole
 Murder Most English (1982) as Detective Inspector Purbright
 Rumpole of the Bailey: Rumpole and the Honourable Member   as Ken Aspen
 Lillie   as Edward Langtry
 Fresh Fields as William Fields
 French Fields as William Fields
 Noah's Ark as Noah Kirby
 Disraeli as Bentinck
 Zodiac as David Gradley
 After the War   as Samuel Jordan
 May to December as Alec Callender
 Midsomer Murders "Market for Murder" as Lord James Chetwood
 Longford (2006) as William Whitelaw
 C. S. Lewis: Beyond Narnia (2005) as C. S. Lewis
 You Can Choose Your Friends (2007) as Ken Snell
 Richard the Lionheart as Sir Kenneth
 Wide-Eye'' as Wide-Eye, Great Grandma Toad and Father Natterjack (voices)

Further reading

Theatre Record and its annual Indexes

References

External links
 
 
 Obituary in The Times, 4 December 2007
 

1933 births
2007 deaths
20th-century English male actors
21st-century English male actors
Alumni of the Italia Conti Academy of Theatre Arts
Alumni of the London Academy of Music and Dramatic Art
English male film actors
English male stage actors
English male television actors
Laurence Olivier Award winners
Male actors from London
People educated at Westminster City School
People from Ealing
People from South Oxfordshire District